Rebecca Wee is an American poet, and associate professor of creative writing.

Biography
Rebecca Wee graduated from St. Olaf College in 1984. She later attended George Mason University where she studied poetry and served as editorial assistant to Carolyn Forche on her 1993 anthology Against Forgetting: Twentieth Century Poetry of Witness.

Rebecca Wee currently holds the post of Associate Professor on the English faculty at Augustana College, Rock Island, Illinois, where she teaches composition, literature, poetry workshops, and independent studies in poetry and creative writing.

Her first book of poems, Uncertain Grace, received the 2000 Hayden Carruth Award for New and Emerging Poets and was subsequently published in 2001 by Copper Canyon Press. In 2003 she was chosen by U.S. Poet Laureate Billy Collins to receive one of two annual Witter Bynner fellowships in poetry, supported by the Library of Congress and the Witter Bynner Foundation for Poetry.

From 2003–2005 Wee served as the second Poet Laureate of the Quad Cities.

Books
 Uncertain Grace, (Copper Canyon Press, 2001),

References

External links
 Library of Congress Page - includes audio
 Library of Congress Witter Bynner fellowships page
 Copper Canyon Press Catalog Page
 Augustana College Faculty Biography page

St. Olaf College alumni
George Mason University alumni
Living people
Poets from Illinois
American women poets
Year of birth missing (living people)
21st-century American women